is a fictional character featured in video games and related media released by Nintendo. Created by Japanese video game designer Shigeru Miyamoto, Luigi is portrayed as the younger fraternal twin brother and sidekick of Mario. Defined by his kind-hearted, yet cowardly demeanor, Luigi appears in many games throughout the Mario franchise, oftentimes accompanying his brother. 

Luigi first appeared in the 1983 Game & Watch game Mario Bros., where he is the character controlled by the second player. He would retain this role in many future games, including Mario Bros., Super Mario Bros., Super Mario Bros. 3, Super Mario World, among other titles. He was first available as a primary character in Super Mario Bros. 2. In more recent appearances, Luigi's role became increasingly restricted to spinoffs, such as the Mario Party and Mario Kart series; however, he has been featured in a starring role in Luigi's Hammer Toss, Mario is Missing, Luigi's Mansion, Luigi's Mansion: Dark Moon, Dr. Luigi, New Super Luigi U, Luigi's Mansion Arcade, and Luigi's Mansion 3. In most of said games, he is called upon to act as the hero because Mario is in need of rescue. Luigi has also appeared in every episode of the three DiC TV series based on the NES and Super NES games.

Originally developed as a palette swap of Mario with a green color scheme instead of red, Luigi has since developed a personality and style of his own. As his role in the Mario series progressed, Luigi evolved into a physically distinct character, and was made taller and thinner than his brother. Nintendo called the period of March 2013 to March 2014 the Year of Luigi to commemorate the thirtieth anniversary of the character's existence. Correspondingly, games released in 2013 emphasized Luigi. An unlockable Luigi-themed version of Mario Bros., titled Luigi Bros., was also included with Super Mario 3D World.

Concept and creation

The events leading to Luigi's creation began in 1982, during the development of Donkey Kong, where Shigeru Miyamoto had created Mario (then known as "Jumpman"), hoping that he would be able to recast the character in a variety of roles in future games. Miyamoto was inspired by Joust to create a game with a simultaneous two-player mode, which led to his development of the game Mario Bros. in 1983. In that game, Luigi was given the role of Mario's brother as the second playable character. Miyamoto observed that the Japanese word ruiji means "similar", thus explaining the similarities in size, shape, and gameplay of Luigi to Mario.

While Miyamoto originally portrayed Mario as a carpenter in Donkey Kong, both Mario and Luigi were styled as Italian plumbers in Mario Bros., on the suggestion of a colleague. Software constraints at the time of the respective game's origins meant that Luigi's first appearance was restricted to a simple palette swap. In terms of graphics and gameplay, the characters were completely identical; the green color scheme adopted for Luigi remained one of his defining physical characteristics in subsequent releases.

After the success of Mario Bros., Luigi was introduced to a wider audience in 1985 with the release of the console game Super Mario Bros. Once again, his role was restricted to a palette swap and could only be used by the second player. The Japanese version of Super Mario Bros. 2 in 1986, later released in the west as Super Mario Bros.: The Lost Levels, marked the beginning of Luigi's development toward becoming a more distinguished character. Luigi's movement was no longer identical; he could now jump higher and farther than his brother, at the expense of movement response and precision.

While this version of Super Mario Bros. 2 was released in Japan, it was deemed to be too difficult for American audiences at the time. Consequently, In 1988, an alternative release was developed to serve as Super Mario Bros. 2 for Western players (and later released in Japan as Super Mario USA); this version played a key role in shaping Luigi's current appearance. The game was a conversion of Yume Kōjō: Doki Doki Panic, with the graphics altered to represent characters and scenes from the Mario franchise. In this release, the character of "Mama", who had the highest jump among the original cast, served as the template for Luigi, resulting in his taller, thinner look, combined with his Mario-esque outfit and boasting green color scheme. There were earlier appearances of Luigi being taller than Mario: in Famicom Grand Prix II: 3D Hot Rally and in Super Mario Bros.: The Great Mission to Rescue Princess Peach!; in the previously mentioned anime he wore a yellow shirt, a blue hat, and blue overalls. Promotional artwork for Super Mario Bros. 3 and Super Mario World depict Luigi with this new look, but the actual games did not adapt this different character design until the 1992 game Super Mario Kart. Luigi's distinctive appearance from Super Mario USA has been used ever since, even for remakes of older games.

Actor portrayal

Much like his appearance, Luigi's vocal portrayal has fluctuated over the years. Mario Kart 64, in which many characters were voiced for the first time, some characters, including Luigi, had two different voices; the North American and European versions of the game feature a low-pitched voice for Luigi, provided by Charles Martinet, who also voices Mario, Wario, and Waluigi. The Japanese version uses a high-pitched, falsetto voice, provided by the then French translator at Nintendo Julien Bardakoff. Inconsistent voice acting continued with many Nintendo 64 games; all versions of Mario Party feature Bardakoff's high-pitched clips from Mario Kart 64. Luigi retained this higher voice in Mario Party 2. In Mario Golf, Mario Tennis, and Mario Party 3, his voice returned to a lower state. Since then, with the exceptions of Mario Kart: Super Circuit and Super Smash Bros. Melee, Luigi has consistently had a medium-pitched voice, performed by Martinet. In Mario Kart: Super Circuit, Luigi's voice was the same high pitched voice from the Japanese version of Mario Kart 64. In Super Smash Bros. and Super Smash Bros. Melee, Luigi's voice is made up of clips from Mario's voice taken from Super Mario 64, with raised pitches. In Super Smash Bros. Brawl, Super Smash Bros. for Nintendo 3DS and Wii U, and Super Smash Bros. Ultimate, he has his own voice (which is medium-pitched) instead of a pitched-up version of Mario's. Luigi will be voiced by Charlie Day in the upcoming 2023 film adaptation.

Characteristics

Luigi is portrayed as the taller, younger brother of Mario, and is usually seen dressed in a green shirt, dark blue overalls, and a green hat with a green "L" insignia. Although Luigi is a plumber like Mario, other facets of his personality vary from game to game; Luigi always seems nervous and timid, but is good-natured and can keep his temper better than his brother. A baby version of the character named Baby Luigi debuted in Super Mario World 2: Yoshi's Island, who is held captive by Kamek. He also appeared in Mario & Luigi: Partners in Time as a playable character along with Baby Mario. He is voiced by Charles Martinet, just like his adult self. Being the younger twin of Mario, Luigi is presumed to be also 24 years old.

While it has not been made official, Daisy may be Luigi's romantic interest. They were a romantic couple in the Super Mario Bros. film and in Mario Kart Wii they are seen in statue dancing together. She was his caddy in NES Open Tournament Golf as Peach was to Mario. Also on Daisy's trophy in Super Smash Bros. Melee, it says that she is possibly Luigi's answer to Mario's Peach.

Surname
Nintendo did not initially give Luigi a surname. The first notable use of "Luigi Mario" was in the 1993 live-action film adaptation. In September 2015, at the Super Mario Bros. 30th Anniversary festival, Miyamoto stated that Mario's full name was Mario Mario. As a result, this indirectly confirms Luigi's full name to be Luigi Mario.

Appearances

Luigi's first appearance was in the 1983 arcade game Mario Bros. as the character controlled by the second player. He retained this role in Wrecking Crew. He later appeared in Super Mario Bros. for the NES, and again in Super Mario Bros.: The Lost Levels, Super Mario Bros. 2, Super Mario Bros. 3, and Super Mario World. Super Mario Bros. 2 introduced Luigi as the taller of the two brothers, as well as the better jumper. Super Mario Bros. 3, and Super Mario World returned to featuring Luigi as a reskinned Mario. He made a minor appearance in his baby form in Super Mario World 2: Yoshi's Island. Luigi was conspicuously absent in Super Mario 64 and Super Mario Sunshine. However, the Nintendo DS remake of Super Mario 64 features him as a playable character alongside Mario, Yoshi, and Wario. He received his own starring role in the GameCube game Luigi's Mansion, where he wins a mansion from a contest he never entered, and saves Mario from King Boo. Luigi's Mansion has cultivated such a cult following that Nintendo made a sequel to the game nearly a decade after the original game's release date. The sequel is called Luigi's Mansion: Dark Moon and is playable on the Nintendo 3DS. He reprised his role in the third game, Luigi's Mansion 3, on Nintendo Switch.

Luigi has been associated with the more difficult second acts of multiple Super Mario games. These include The Lost Levels, Super Mario Galaxy 2, New Super Luigi U and the new game plus in Super Mario 3D Land, which offer more challenging elaborations on their respective predecessors and allow the player to use Luigi as the main character, with whom reduced friction and higher jumping is consistent in all of these games. Luigi became playable in the Nintendo DS game New Super Mario Bros. as a hidden character, and as a hidden character in the Wii game Super Mario Galaxy. In its sequel, Super Mario Galaxy 2, the player can switch out for Luigi throughout the game. He also appears as a playable character in New Super Mario Bros. Wii, where four players can play at once cooperatively as Mario, Luigi, and two Toads. He also appears in Super Mario 3D Land as a playable character as well as New Super Mario Bros. 2 and New Super Mario Bros. U, the latter having a DLC mode, where he is the main character, called New Super Luigi U. It has levels altered to his specific play abilities, including higher jumping. The DLC is also available as a standalone retail version. Luigi also appeared in Super Mario 3D World along with his brother, Peach, Rosalina and Toad.

Luigi appears in many of the Mario spin-offs, including Mario Kart, Mario Party, and all of the Mario sports titles. He also appears in all five installments of the Super Smash Bros. series; in the first three installments and Ultimate, he is an unlockable character.

Luigi has appeared in every Mario role-playing game. While he originally made a cameo appearance in the end credits of Super Mario RPG, he appears more prominently in the Paper Mario series. He is a non-playable character in the original Paper Mario. In the sequel Paper Mario: The Thousand-Year Door, he appears yet again as a non-player character, going on a separate adventure from Mario's. Super Paper Mario features him as a playable character after he is initially brainwashed into working for the antagonist under the name "Mr. L." In Paper Mario: Sticker Star and Paper Mario: Color Splash, Luigi plays a minor role and can be found in the background of certain levels for a coin reward. In Color Splash, Luigi appears at the end of the game driving a kart and helps Mario reach Bowser's Castle. In Paper Mario: The Origami King, he once again helps Mario by retrieving the keys of Peach's Castle himself. The Mario & Luigi series features Luigi as a main protagonist; the events of the games focus on him and his brother Mario. He has appeared in all seven Mario & Luigi games.

Other media

Luigi made his animated debut in the 1986 film Super Mario Bros.: The Great Mission to Save Princess Peach!. In the film, where he was voiced by Yū Mizushima, he was not yet given a consistent color scheme, sporting a yellow shirt and a blue hat and overalls. In the film, Luigi was a greedy character, and even left Mario at one point to look for coins. He was also a little more serious, but less courageous, than his brother Mario, who constantly daydreamed about Princess Peach.

Luigi later made an appearance in the third of a trilogy of OVA's entitled Amada Anime Series: Super Mario Bros. released in 1989, in which the Mario characters acted out the story of Snow White. He appears at the end of the video to save Mario and Peach from the Wicked Queen, portrayed by Koopa.

Luigi regularly appeared in The Super Mario Bros. Super Show!, airing from 1989 to 1990, which cast Danny Wells as both his live-action portrayal and voice. Like his brother, Luigi's voice actor changed in later cartoons, in his case to Tony Rosato. Even though he was not the starring character in the show, Luigi appeared in all 91 episodes of the three DiC Mario cartoons, in one of which his brother himself did not appear ("Life's Ruff" from The Adventures of Super Mario Bros. 3).

Luigi played a different role in the Super Mario Bros. film, where he was portrayed by John Leguizamo. He is depicted as a more easy-going character in contrast to the cynical Mario, portrayed by Bob Hoskins. In the film, Luigi is not Mario's twin, but is much younger to the point that Mario is said to have been like a surrogate father to him since their parents' deaths, and his romantic relationship with Daisy is one of the film's main plot elements. He will be voiced by Charlie Day in the upcoming 2023 film adaptation.

Luigi has also appeared in several Robot Chicken sketches, always alongside Mario. In one sketch, he and Mario accidentally appear in Vice City, from the Grand Theft Auto series, while another features them competing in a Cannonball Run-styled car race.

In 2015, game designer Josh Millard released Ennuigi which relates the story of Luigi's inability to come to terms with the lack of narrative in the original Super Mario Bros. Reception regarding Luigi's character in Ennuigi ranged from "depressed", "laconic", "perpetually miserable", to "an angsty teenager who just finished writing a book report about Albert Camus' The Stranger." In a Reddit thread, Millard commented "I [...] think it's a pretty weird implied narrative once you step back and look at it, and enjoyed funneling some thoughts about all that into a recharacterization of Luigi as a guy who's as legitimately confused and distressed by his strange life as you'd expect a person to be once removed from the bubble of cartoony context of the franchise."

Year of Luigi

On March 19, 2013, Nintendo began the "Year of Luigi". This included a year of Luigi-themed games like Luigi's Mansion: Dark Moon, Dr. Luigi, Mario & Luigi: Dream Team, and New Super Luigi U. A Luigi's Mansion statue was released on Club Nintendo. On March 19, 2014, the Year of Luigi ended.

Month of Luigi
On October 4, 2019, Nintendo declared that the entire month of October would be the Month of Luigi. This was done to celebrate Luigi's Mansion 3, which was released on October 31, 2019. The Month of Luigi ended on November 1, 2019.

Reception
Since his appearance in Super Mario Bros., Luigi has received highly positive reception. Nintendo Power listed Luigi as their fifth favourite hero, citing his dependability while describing him as being an underdog. They also listed him as having one of the best mustaches. GameDaily listed the "neglected guy" as one of their top 25 video game archetypes, citing Luigi as an example and stating that he lacks the charisma of his older brother Mario and that he should get another starring role. They also listed Luigi's Poltergust 3000 from Luigi's Mansion as one of the top 25 Nintendo gimmicks. UGO Networks ranked Luigi at No. 16 on their "25 Most Memorable Italians in Video Games" list, ranking him over Mario himself.

Luigi has been featured in many "Top Sidekicks" lists. Machinima placed Luigi on their "Top 10 Sidekicks in Gaming" list. He was also listed as the best sidekick in video games by Maximum PC. IGN ranked him second on their top 10 list, commenting "No pair illustrates brotherly love like Mario and Luigi". Maxim listed Luigi as the second most underrated sidekick, behind Waylon Smithers of the television series "The Simpsons".

References

External links
 
 Luigi on Super Mario Wiki

Fantasy film characters
Luigi
Fictional American people in video games
Fictional characters from New York City
Fictional ghost hunters
Fictional hammer fighters
Fictional Italian American people
Fictional Italian people in video games
Fictional plumbers
Fictional male sportspeople
Twin characters in video games
Male characters in video games
Mario (franchise) characters
Nintendo protagonists
Super Smash Bros. fighters
Video game characters introduced in 1983
Video game characters with fire or heat abilities
Video game sidekicks